Vandalia Christian Academy (VCS) is a private K–12 Christian school located in Greensboro, North Carolina, USA. It is a member of the NCCSA and was founded by Pastor David Oates in the 1970s. The school has approximately 700 students and is one of the largest Christian schools in the state.

VCS History 
The vision for a Christian school was begun by Pastor David Oates of Jones Memorial Baptist Church (the former name of Vandalia Baptist Church). His concerns over the depraved condition of the public schools prompted him to start the school. He cited three specific reasons for starting the school: education in a Christian atmosphere, spiritual training, and evangelism.

Vandalia Christian School, a non-profit ministry of Vandalia Baptist Church, began in 1970 with a kindergarten class that met in the church. On August 25, 1971, the school opened for grades kindergarten through 10th with over 300 students. In 1980, the ministry purchased additional land and the construction of a multipurpose building housing classrooms, office space, cafeteria, library, music room, and gymnasium was completed.

In 1982, Donnie Oates became pastor of Vandalia Baptist Church and served as school administrator for 14 years. In 1996, Dr. Mark Weatherford joined the staff as principal and later became the administrator.

References

External links
 Homepage

Christian schools in North Carolina
Schools in Guilford County, North Carolina
Private high schools in North Carolina
Private middle schools in North Carolina
Private elementary schools in North Carolina